Jacques Loeb (April 7, 1859 – February 11, 1924) was a German-born American physiologist and biologist.

Biography

Jacques Loeb, firstborn son of a Jewish family from the German Eifel region, was educated at the universities of Berlin, Munich, and Strasburg (M.D. 1884). He took postgraduate courses at the universities of Strasburg and Berlin, and in 1886 became assistant at the physiological institute of the University of Würzburg, remaining there till 1888. In a similar capacity, he then went to Strasburg University. During his vacations he pursued biological researches, at Kiel in 1888, and at Naples in 1889 and 1890.

Jacques Loeb first arrived in the United States in 1891 when he accepted a position at Bryn Mawr College, however, they provided insufficient facilities for his work which would later influence his resignation. In 1892, he was called to the University of Chicago as assistant professor of physiology and experimental biology, while later becoming associate professor in 1895, and professor of physiology in 1899. John B. Watson (the "father of Behaviorism") attended Loeb's neurology classes at the University of Chicago. He was elected as a member to the American Philosophical Society in 1899. In 1902, he was called to fill a similar chair at the University of California. Writer John Fleming Wilson (1877-1922) called Carmel Point "Point Loeb" after Professor Loeb, one of the many professors who had summer homes on Professors' Row on the edge of Carmel-by-the-Sea, California.

In 1910, Loeb moved to the Rockefeller Institute for Medical Research in New York, where he headed a department created for him. He remained at Rockefeller (now Rockefeller University) until his death. Throughout his career, Loeb spent some summers at the Marine Biological Laboratory in Woods Hole, Massachusetts, performing experiments on various marine invertebrates. While there, Jacques Loeb performed his most famous experiment, on artificial parthenogenesis. With this experiment, Loeb was able to cause the sea urchins' eggs to begin embryonic development without sperm. The slight chemical modifications of the water in which the eggs were kept, served as the stimulus for the development to begin. Later in 1918, Loeb established and became the first Editor of the Journal of General Physiology.

Jacques Loeb became one of the most famous scientists in America, widely covered in newspapers and magazines, influencing other important individuals in the scientific world such as B.F. Skinner. He was the model for the character of Max Gottlieb in Sinclair Lewis's Pulitzer-winning novel Arrowsmith, the first great work of fiction to idealize and idolize pure science. Mark Twain also wrote an essay titled "Dr. Loeb's Incredible Discovery", urging the reader not to support a rigid general consensus, but to instead be open to new scientific advances.

Loeb was nominated many times for the Nobel Prize but never won.

Loeb was an atheist.

Research area
The main subjects of Loeb's work were:

 Animal tropisms and their relation to the instincts of animals
 Heteromorphosis, the replacement of an injured or removed organ by a different organ
 Toxic and antitoxic effects of ions
 Artificial parthenogenesis
 Hybridization of the eggs of sea-urchins by the sperm of starfish

Works
Among Loeb's works the following may be mentioned: 
 Der Heliotropismus der Thiere und seine Uebereinstimmung mit dem Heliotropismus der Pflanzen, Würzburg: Verlag von Georg Hertz, 1890.
 Untersuchungen zur physiologischen Morphologie der Thiere, Würzburg: Verlag von Georg Hertz, 1891–1892. 2 vols., vol. 1: Ueber Heteromorphose, vol. 2: Organbildung und Wachsthum.
 Einleitung in die vergleichende Gehirnphysiologie und vergleichende Psychologie, Leipzig: J. A. Barth, 1899. English ed., Comparative physiology of the brain and comparative psychology, New York: Putnam, 1900.
 Studies in general physiology, Chicago: The University of Chicago Press, 1905.
 The dynamics of living matter, New York: Columbia University Press, 1906.
 The mechanistic conception of life: biological essays, Chicago: The University of Chicago Press, 1912; reprint, Cambridge, Mass.: Harvard University Press, 1964.
 Artificial parthenogenesis and fertilization, tr. from German by W. O. Redman King, rev. and ed. by Loeb. Chicago: The University of Chicago Press, 1913.
 The organism as a whole, from a physicochemical viewpoint, New York: Putnam, 1916.
 Forced movements, tropisms, and animal conduct, Philadelphia: Lippincott, 1918.
 Proteins and the theory of colloidal behavior, New York: McGraw-Hill, 1922.

The Mechanistic Conception of Life is Loeb's most famous and influential work. It contains English translations of some of his previous publications in German.

Family
His younger brother Leo also emigrated to the United States where he became a noted pathologist.

References

Sources

External links

 Jacques Loeb at The Embryo Project Encyclopedia.
 Loeb Family Tree
 Jacques Loeb at the Jewish Encyclopedia.
 Jacques Loeb at infoplease.com.
National Academy of Sciences Biographical Memoir

1859 births
1924 deaths
Jewish biologists
People from Mayen
People from the Rhine Province
19th-century German Jews
German emigrants to the United States
German physiologists
American atheists
American physiologists
University of Chicago faculty
Rockefeller University people
Members of the United States National Academy of Sciences